Dorsal digital arteries arise from the bifurcation of dorsal metacarpal arteries. They travel along the sides and dorsal aspects of the phalanges of the middle finger, ring finger, and little finger. They communicate with the proper palmar digital arteries. 

They run with the dorsal digital nerves of ulnar nerve and dorsal digital nerves of radial nerve.

See also
 Dorsal digital arteries of foot

External links
 
 http://www.portfolio.mvm.ed.ac.uk/studentwebs/session1/group50/hand.htm

Arteries of the upper limb